Josaphat Kuntsevych, OSBM ( – 12 November 1623) was a Basilian monk and archeparch of the Ruthenian Catholic Church who on 12 November 1623 was killed by an angry mob in Vitebsk, in the eastern peripheries of the Polish–Lithuanian Commonwealth. He is said to be the best-known victim of anti-Catholic violence related to implementing the Union of Brest, and has been declared a martyr and saint of the Catholic Church.

His death reflects the conflict among Orthodox and Catholic Christians that had intensified after the Ruthenian Orthodox Church (Kiev Metropolitanate) confirmed its communion with the Catholic Church through the 1596 Union of Brest.

Biography

Historical and religious background

King Sigismund III Vasa's policy for the Counter-Reformation in the Polish–Lithuanian Commonwealth was to reunite, "through missions to non-Catholics, both Protestant and Orthodox," all Christians into the Catholic Church. After preliminary negotiations with Sigismund III and with Grand Chancellor and Great Hetman of the Crown Jan Zamoyski, a delegation of bishops from the Eastern Orthodox  was sent to Rome in 1595 to accede to the Union of Brest on condition that their rituals and discipline were left intact. Most Eastern Orthodox bishops within the Commonwealth, including Michael Rohoza, metropolitan of Kiev – but at Vilnius, Vilnius Voivodeship, the capital city of the Grand Duchy of Lithuania, in the Polish–Lithuanian Commonwealth – were signatories of the Union of Brest in 1596 which brought the Metropolitanate of Kiev into communion with the pope. Two ecclesiastical factions, those Eastern Orthodox bishops who were signatories and those Eastern Orthodox bishops who were not signatories, met and excommunicated each other, but those who did not assent were in a much worse position than before, because they were no longer officially recognized. The Union resulted in two sectarian groups:

Eastern Orthodox adherents who did assent to the Union of Brest articles became Eastern Catholic and were known as "Uniates", or "" in Polish. They were considered as "schismatics and traitors" by the Orthodox Church. "About two-thirds of the Ruthenian population" were "Uniates" by 1620. The northeastern voivodeships became predominantly "Uniate".
Eastern Orthodox adherents who did not assent to the Union of Brest articles remained Eastern Orthodox and were known as "", or "" in Polish; they were considered religious dissidents by the government. The southeastern voivodeships became predominantly Disuniate. Disuniates were subjected to varying degrees of religious persecution by the state with the active support of Uniate and Latin Catholic clergy. The Disuniates were leaderless until a reestablished Eastern Orthodox  was consecrated in 1620, which the government legalized in 1632.

Early life
He was born Ioann Kuntsevych in 1580 or 1584 in Volodymyr, Volhynian Voivodeship, in the Lesser Poland Province of the Polish Crown (now in Ukraine). He was baptized into a family associated with the Eastern Orthodox Church.

Although descended from Ruthenian nobility (szlachta, Kuncewicz family), his father had embarked in business, and held the office of town-councilor. Both of Kuntsevych's parents encouraged religious participation and Christian piety in the young John. In the school at Volodymyr he gave evidence of unusual talent; he studied Church Slavonic and memorized most of the Horologion, which from this period he began to read daily. From this source he drew his early religious education.

Owing to his parents' poverty, Kuntsevych was apprenticed to a merchant named Papovič in Vilnius. In Vilnius, divided through the contentions of the various religious sects, he became acquainted with men such as Josyf Veliamyn Rutsky, a former Calvinist who converted to Catholicism and transferred from the Western to the Byzantine Rite. Rutsky supported the recent union with Rome, and under his influence Kuntsevych grew interested in the Catholic Church.

Monk and archbishop
In 1604, in his early 20s, Kuntsevych entered the Monastery of the Trinity (Church and monastery of Holy Trinity) of the Order of Saint Basil the Great in Vilnius, at which time he was given the religious name of Josaphat. Stories of his sanctity rapidly spread and distinguished people began to visit the young monk. After a notable life as a layman, Rutsky also joined the Order. When Josaphat was ordained to the diaconate, his regular services and labor for the Church had already begun. As a result of his efforts, the number of novices to the Order steadily increased, and under Rutsky – who had meanwhile been ordained a priest – a revival of Eastern Catholic monastic life began among the Ruthenians (Belarusians and Ukrainians). In 1609, after private study under Jesuit Valentin Groza Fabricy, Josaphat was ordained a priest by a Catholic bishop. He subsequently became the hegumen (prior) of several monasteries. On November 12, 1617, he was consecrated as the coadjutor archeparch for the Archeparchy of Polotsk. He succeeded as archeparch in March 1618. During his episcopacy, the Saint Sophia Cathedral in Polotsk was rebuilt in 1618–1620.

Kuntsevych faced the daunting task of bringing the local populace to accept union with Rome. He faced stiff opposition from the monks, who feared liturgical Latinisation of the Byzantine Rite. As archeparch he: restored the churches: issued a catechism to the clergy, with instructions that it should be memorized; composed rules for priestly life, and entrusted deacons the task of superintending their observance; assembled synods in various towns in the dioceses; and firmly opposed the Grand Chancellor of the Grand Duchy of Lithuania, Lew Sapieha, who wished to make what Josaphat saw as too many concessions to the Eastern Orthodox. Throughout all his strivings and all his occupations, he continued his religious devotion as a monk, and never abated his desire for mortification of the flesh. Through all this he was successful in winning over a large portion of the people.

Discontent increased among the inhabitants of the eastern voivodeships. In 1618 a Disuniate at Mohilev, Vitebsk Voivodeship, who apparently assented to the Union of Brest, openly resisted its implementation and replaced Uniate clergy with Disuniate clergy. They substituted the names of Timothy II, patriarch of Constantinople, and Osman II, sultan of the Ottoman Empire, in the liturgy for those of Pope Paul V and Sigismund III. The resistance at Mohilev led to increased government intervention against Disuniates, and a 1619 judicial decree condemned the leaders of the insurrection to death and devolved all the previously Eastern Orthodox church buildings at Mohilev to the Eastern Catholic Archeparchy of Polotsk.

Norman Davies wrote in God's Playground that Kuntsevych "was no man of peace, and had been involved in all manner of oppressions, including that most offensive of petty persecutions – the refusal to allow the Orthodox peasants to bury their dead in consecrated ground;" in other words, he is said to have prohibited burial of Disuniates in Uniate cemeteries.

The Disuniates did not collapse, however. In 1620 they assembled in synod at Kiev, protected by Petro Konashevych-Sahaidachny, hetman of Zaporizhian Cossacks, and elected new Eastern Orthodox bishops including Meletius Smotrytsky as archbishop-elect of Polotsk, all of whom were consecrated "in great secrecy" at Kiev by Theophanes III, Greek Orthodox Patriarch of Jerusalem, Neophyte, metropolitan of Sofia, and Avramios, bishop of Stagoi. Thus a rival Disuniate hierarchy was established. Sigismund III accused Theophanes III of being a covert agent working on behalf of the Ottoman Empire and ordered his arrest and arrest of those consecrated by him.

Smotrytsky publicly claimed that Kuntsevych was preparing a 

After 1620, according to Orest Subtelny, in Ukraine, sectarian violence over ownership of church property increased and "hundreds of clerics on both sides died in confrontations that often took the form of pitched battles."
 
The government imposed a settlement on the "unsettling and destructive" conflict in 1632 by legalizing the Disuniate hierarchy and redistributing church property between Uniates and Disuniates.

Death
 In October 1623 Kuntsevych ordered the arrest of the last priest who was clandestinely holding Orthodox services at Vitebsk, where Kuntsevych had a residence. Enraged at this, some Orthodox townspeople lynched Kuntsevych on 12 November. Witnesses of the event described it as follows:

John Szlupas wrote, in The Princeton Theological Review, that the Lithuanian Protestants were also the secret instigators in the murder of Kuntsevych, and Smotrytsky, the chief agent in the murder, was in constant communication with them.

In January 1624, a commission presided over by Sapieha investigated Kuntsevych's murder and sentenced 93 people to death for their involvement in the conspiracy, and many were banished and their property confiscated. The townhall and the disuniate churches were destroyed, and the franchises of the city abolished, but restored under the subsequent reign. With Kuntsevych's death the Disuniates were completely broken up in Lithuania, and their leaders were severely punished. The Disuniates lost their churches in Vitebsk, Polotsk, Orsha, Mogilev, and other places. Smotrytsky joined the Uniates in order to escape punishment, and turned his pen against the Disuniates whose weaknesses were not secrets from him.
The body was recovered from the river and lay in state in the cathedral of Polatsk. Beatification followed in 1643, but canonization did not take place until 1867, more than two centuries later. The body is now in Saint Peter's Basilica in Rome, placed under the altar of Saint Basil the Great.

Legacy

Hagiography

As a boy Kuntsevych was said to have shunned the usual games of childhood, prayed much, and lost no opportunity to assist at the Church services. Children especially regarded him with affection. As an apprentice, he devoted every leisure hour to prayer and study. At first Papovič viewed this behavior with displeasure, but Josaphat gradually won such a position in his esteem that Papovič offered him his entire fortune and his daughter's hand. But Josaphat's love for the religious life never wavered.

Kuntsevych's favourite devotional exercise was the traditional Eastern monastic practice of prostrations, in which the head touches the ground, while saying the Jesus Prayer. Never eating meat, he fasted much, wore a hair shirt and a chain around his waist. He slept on the bare floor, and chastised his body until the blood flowed. The Jesuits frequently urged him to set some bounds to his austerities.

From Kuntsevych's zealous study of the Church Slavonic Byzantine Rite liturgical books he drew many proofs of Catholic doctrine and wrote several original works. Throughout his adult life, he was distinguished by his extraordinary zeal in performing the Church services and by extraordinary devotion during the Divine Liturgy. Not only in the church did he preach and hear confessions, but likewise in the fields, hospitals, prisons, and even on his personal journeys. This zeal, united with his kindness for the poor, led great numbers of Eastern Orthodox confession Ruthenians to a religious conversion to the Eastern Catholic confession and Catholic unity. Among his converts were many important personages such as deposed Patriarch Ignatius, of Moscow, and

Canonization

After numerous miracles attributed to Kuntsevych were reported to Church officials, Pope Urban VIII appointed a commission, in 1628, to inquire into his possible canonization, which examined 116 witnesses under oath. Josaphat's body was claimed to be incorrupt five years after his death. In 1637, a second commission investigated his life and, in 1643, Josaphat was beatified. He was canonized on June 29, 1867, by Pope Pius IX.

The Ukrainian Greek Catholic Church celebrates his feast day on the first Sunday after the Julian Calendar  (Gregorian Calendar November 25). When, in 1867, Pius IX inserted his feast into the General Roman Calendar, it was assigned to November 14, which was the first free day after November 12, which was then occupied by the feast of "Saint Martin I, Pope and Martyr." In the General Roman Calendar of 1969, this latter feast was moved to Pope Saint Martin's  ('birthday to heaven'), and Saint Josaphat's feast was moved to that date, his own . Some Traditionalist Catholics continue to observe the General Roman Calendar of 1954, the General Roman Calendar of Pope Pius XII, or the General Roman Calendar of 1960, in which the feast day is on November 14.

Kuntsevych's canonization process began in the interval of the January Uprising of 1863–1865 against the Russian Empire and was "understood in many circles, including Polish, Russian, and Ruthenian circles, as a papal gesture of moral support for the insurgent Poles." A Russophile Ruthenian newspaper, published several negative articles about Kuntsevych. This antagonism to his canonization "makes sense within the context of the Russophile hegemony in Ruthenian public opinion" and was seen as an insult to Imperial Russia. The Russian government responded, in 1875, with further Russification and forced conversion of the Eastern Catholic Chełm Eparchy, the last Eastern Catholic eparchy in the Russian Empire.

Veneration

According to The Oxford Dictionary of Saints, Kuntsevych could be thought of as a patron "of ecumenical endeavour today."

Churches
St. Josaphat Kuntsevych is the patron saint of a number of Polish and Ukrainian churches and parishes in the United States and Canada, including:

 Basilica of St. Josaphat, in Milwaukee, Wisconsin
 St. Josaphat Ukrainian Catholic Cathedral of the Ukrainian Catholic Eparchy of Saint Josaphat in Parma, Ohio.
 St. Josaphat Roman Catholic Church in Chicago, Illinois
 St. Josaphat's Parish of Bayside, Queens, New York
 St. Josaphat's Ukrainian Catholic Church in Rochester, NY
 St. Josaphat's Roman Catholic Church in Detroit
 St. Josaphat Parish in Cheektowaga, New York, in the Roman Catholic Diocese of Buffalo
 St. Josaphat's Cathedral and Ukrainian elementary school in Toronto
 St. Josaphat Ukrainian Catholic Cathedral in the Ukrainian Catholic Eparchy of Edmonton, Alberta
St. Josaphat Ukrainian Catholic Church of Trenton, NJ

Society of St. Josaphat
A group of Ukrainian Catholics who oppose the changes made in the Ruthenian Rite to reduce Roman influence have formed the Priestly Society of Saint Josaphat. They are linked to the Society of St. Pius X, which has not recognized the authority of the Second Vatican Council.

Relic

 There is a relic of the saint in the "catacombs" of Holy Trinity Roman Catholic Church in Chicago.
 There are two relics of Saint Josaphat located in the Basilica of St. Josaphat, in Milwaukee Wisconsin. One is located inside the High Altar and the other is located in the lower Chapel. Vatican documentation is presented in the lower Chapel of the authenticity of the relics.

Controversy

Josaphat's canonization has been highly controversial among Ukrainian Orthodox population, mostly due to persecution of Orthodox practices incited by Josaphat. These practices include the arrest of Orthodox priests for holding liturgies and inciting the burning of Orthodox faithful for celebrating a thanksgiving liturgy. Such actions led the Roman Catholic chancelor Lew Sapieha to write a letter to Josaphat in behalf of the King, condemning him for his actions and claiming that his persecution was his own fault.

See also

Blessed Josaphata Hordashevska - Foundress of the Sisters Servants of Mary Immaculate and missionary under patronage of St. Josaphat
List of Catholic saints
Saint Josaphat Kuntsevych, patron saint archive

Notes

References

Further reading
For background about the ecclesiastical structures and conditions, see 
For Pope Pius XI's encyclical Ecclesiam Dei commemorating the 300th anniversary of Kuntsevych's martyrdom, see  Translated in 
For Pope Pius XII's encyclical Orientales omnes Ecclesias commemorating the 350th anniversary of the Union of Brest, see  Translated in

External links
 Ukrainian Catholic Eparchy of St. Josaphat
 Patron Saints Index: Saint Josaphat
 Josaphat Kuntsevych at Encyclopedia of Ukraine

1580s births
1623 deaths
People from Volodymyr-Volynskyi
People from Volhynian Voivodeship
Josaphat
Polish-Lithuanian monks
Archimandrites
Converts to Eastern Catholicism from Eastern Orthodoxy
Eastern Catholic writers
Former Ukrainian Orthodox Christians
Uniate archbishops of Polotsk
17th-century Eastern Catholic martyrs
17th-century Christian martyrs
Ukrainian Roman Catholic saints
Polish Roman Catholic saints
Eastern Catholic saints
Eastern Orthodox–Catholic conflicts
Burials at St. Peter's Basilica
Incorrupt saints
Basilian saints
Beatifications by Pope Urban VIII
Canonizations by Pope Pius IX
People murdered in Belarus
Religious leaders from Volhynia